Branco is a Portuguese and Galician surname meaning 'White.'  Notable people with the surname include:

Cassiano Branco (1897-1970), Portuguese architect
Cristina Branco (born 1972), Portuguese fado singer
Joaquim Rafael Branco (born 1953), São Toméan politician
Jorge Branco de Sampaio (born 1939), Portuguese lawyer, politician, and the former President of the Republic
Luís de Freitas Branco (1890-1955), Portuguese composer and an academic
Marcelo Branco (born 1945), Brazilian bridge player
Paulo Branco (born 1950), Portuguese film producer
Serge Branco (born 1980), Cameroonian footballer
Silvio Branco (born 1966), Italian boxer
Justin Branco (born 1989), Portuguese entrepreneur

Portuguese-language surnames